Sarah Elizabeth Butler (born February 11, 1985) is an American actress. She is best known for playing the role of Jennifer Hills in the I Spit on Your Grave film series.

Early life
A native of Puyallup, Washington, Butler was interested in the arts while growing up; she sang in choirs, entered singing competitions, and performed in high school and community theatre. She graduated from Rogers High School in 2003. Butler relocated to Los Angeles to study theatre at the University of Southern California, and then played Princess Belle in Beauty and the Beast, for a year and a half at Disneyland. She dropped out of college, focused on finding a talent agent, and began auditioning for work in television and film.

Career
Butler guest-starred on the television series CSI: Miami and CSI: NY. She was cast in the film A Couple of White Chicks at the Hair Dresser and the 2008 Syfy TV horror film Flu Bird Horror. She had a role that year on the web series Luke 11:17, directed by Don Stark. She also had a recurring role on the web series I Heart Vampires.

Butler won the lead in the 2010 rape and revenge thriller I Spit on Your Grave, a remake of the 1978 cult film of the same title. Although initially put off by the film's nudity and violence, the film's strong character arc and "feminist edge" helped convince her to take the role. Butler starred as Jennifer Hills, a novelist who is brutally gang raped while staying at a cabin in the woods; her character then seeks revenge on her rapists. Directed by Steven R. Monroe, the film was released on October 8.

Butler began filming the psychological thriller The Stranger Within, alongside Estella Warren and William Baldwin in Mallorca, Spain in November 2011. The film was also scheduled to shoot in Copenhagen, Denmark and New York City. Butler then joined the cast of the independent thriller Treachery, starring Michael Biehn, which began filming in Los Angeles in June 2012. In 2013, Butler starred in the horror film The Demented, with Michael Welch and Kayla Ewell, and the anthology film Tom  Holland's Twisted Tales, playing a bomb disposal expert in the segment "Boom". In 2014, she played a murder victim in the episode "Once Upon a Time in the West" of the ABC television drama Castle.

In 2015, Butler reprised her role as Jennifer Hills in I Spit on Your Grave III: Vengeance Is Mine, a sequel to 2010's I Spit on Your Grave. Butler co-starred with Lindsay Hartley and Traci Lords in the 2016 Lifetime TV film Nightmare Nurse. She also played a comedian in Debra Eisenstadt's film Before The Sun Explodes, which premiered at the 2016 South by Southwest film festival. Butler guest starred on the ABC television series Grey's Anatomy, playing Danielle in the episode "You Haven't Done Nothin'". In 2017, she starred with Charles Shaughnessy in Moontrap Target Earth, produced by the makers of the 1989 sci-fi film Moontrap. She also starred in the Lifetime TV film Infidelity in Suburbia as Laura, a woman who begins an extramarital relationship.  Butler also appears in the film Doubting Thomas. Most recently, Butler joined the cast of writer/director Chris Blake's indie horror film All Light Will End, alongside Andy Buckley, John Schuck and Sam Jones III.

Personal life
On June 10, 2021, she married musician Mel Elias, after seven years of dating.

Filmography

References

External links

1985 births
Actresses from Washington (state)
American film actresses
American television actresses
Living people
People from Puyallup, Washington
USC School of Dramatic Arts alumni
21st-century American actresses